Aleksandra Valeryevna Parshina (born 2 August 1995) is a Russian snowboarder. She competed in the 2022 Winter Olympics, in Women's Snowboard Cross.

She competed at the 2019–20 FIS Snowboard World Cup, 2020–21 FIS Snowboard World Cup, and  2021–22 FIS Snowboard World Cup.

References

External links 

 Beijing Winter Olympics 2022: day five – in pictures – Diverse Bulletin

1995 births
Russian female snowboarders
Living people
People from Magadan
Snowboarders at the 2022 Winter Olympics
Olympic snowboarders of Russia
Sportspeople from Magadan Oblast